Philippe François de Berghes (1646–1704) was a diplomat and military commander in the Spanish Netherlands and became the first bearer of the title of prince of Grimberghen.

Family 
He was born into the House of Glymes on 17 September 1646, the fifth child and eldest son of Eugène de Berghes, second count of Grimbergen, and Florence-Marguerite de Renesse, lady of Feluy and Écaussinnes. His grandfather René de Renesse, 1st Count of Warfusée is a descendant of Henry III of Nassau-Breda. He succeeded his father and became the third count of Grimbergen. He was the older brother of Georges-Louis de Berghes. 

In 1674 he married Marie-Jacqueline de Lalaing, with whom he had three children. After his death he was succeeded by his son Alphonse Dominique François de Berghes, who became the 2nd Prince of Grimberghen and a Grandee of Spain.

His main residences were the princely castle in Grimbergen inherited from his father, and the castle of Feluy inherited from his mother.

Career 
Berghes served in the Army of Flanders, initially as commander of a Walloon regiment in the service of King Charles II of Spain, rising to the rank of general in 1684 and being appointed councillor of war. On 23 May 1686 the king rewarded him for 20 years of service with the title of prince. On 17 March 1694 he was created Knight of the Golden Fleece, being invested by Maximilian II Emanuel, Elector of Bavaria.

In 1688 he was sent as envoy to James II of England to congratulate him on the birth of the Prince of Wales. In 1693 he carried out a similar mission to the court of the King of Denmark.

In 1690 he was appointed governor and captain general of the county of Hainaut, directing the defence of Mons during the siege of 1691. He was appointed governor of Brussels on 17 April 1695, and led the defence of the city during the Bombardment of Brussels later that year.

He died in Brussels on 12 September 1704.

Ancestry

References

Glymes family
Knights of the Golden Fleece
1646 births
1704 deaths
Belgian princes